Sammarineses for Freedom (SpL) was, according to its statutes, a social liberal and Christian liberal political party in San Marino.

The party was founded in 2002 by splinters of the Sammarinese Socialist Party. In the 2006 general election SpL won 1.8% of the vote and one out of 60 seats. In the 2008 general election the party ran in list with the larger Party of Socialists and Democrats, within the Reforms and Freedom coalition which won 25 seats out of 60 in the Grand and General Council gaining 45.78% of the national vote. The Sammarinese for Freedom party itself gained a few seats.

The party collapsed in 2012, not being able to participate in the 2012 general election.

References

Defunct political parties in San Marino
Liberal parties in San Marino
Political parties established in 2002
Political parties disestablished in 2012
Pro-European political parties in San Marino
2002 establishments in San Marino
2012 disestablishments in San Marino